Belém de Maria (Bethlehem of Mariah) is a city located in the state of Pernambuco, Brazil. Located  at 150 km away from Recife, capital of the state of Pernambuco, Belém de Maria has an estimated (IBGE 2020) population of 12,122 inhabitants.

Geography
 State - Pernambuco
 Region - Zona da mata Pernambucana
 Boundaries - Bonito   (N);  Catende    (S and E);  Lagoa dos Gatos, Cupira and São Joaquim do Monte   (W)
 Area - 69.47 km2
 Elevation - 227 m
 Hydrography - Una River
 Vegetation - Subperenifólia forest
 Clima - Hot tropical and humid
 Annual average temperature - 22.0 c
 Distance to Recife - 150 km

Economy

The main economic activities in Belém de Maria are based in agribusiness, especially sugarcane, bananas, manioc; and livestock such as cattle.

Economic indicators

Economy by Sector
2006

Health indicators

References

Municipalities in Pernambuco